Haimei Zheng is a Chinese-American materials scientist who is a senior scientist in Materials Sciences Division at the Lawrence Berkeley National Laboratory. She is an adjunct professor in Department of Materials Science and Engineering at the University of California, Berkeley. Her research considers the nucleation, nanoscale materials transformations, and dynamic phenomena at solid-liquid interfaces, which she studies by developing the advanced in situ electron microscopy techniques. She is a Fellow of the Materials Research Society.

Early life and education 
Zheng was born in China. She was an undergraduate student at Chongqing University and she got a master's degree at Tianjin University, where she  majored both in materials science. She moved to the United States for graduate research and earned her doctorate degree at the University of Maryland, College Park. She was supervised by Ramamoorthy Ramesh and Lourdes Salamanca-Riba. Her Ph.D. research was on the growth and characterization of multiferroic thin film nanostructures. After completing her doctorate, Zheng was appointed a postdoctoral researcher at the University of California, Berkeley. She spent a year in Ramesh group at Berkeley on her extended Ph.D. research project before joining the National Center for Electron Microscopy at Lawrence Berkeley National Laboratory and Chemistry Department at the University of California, Berkeley, where she worked alongside Ulrich Dahmen and Paul Alivisatos. During her postdoctoral research, she studied the growth of nanocrystals in solution. She showed that whilst some crystals grow steadily, via a process of nucleation and aggregation, others grow in spurts. This fits and spurts like growth is driven by coalescence events.

Research and career 
Zheng was appointed Staff Scientist in materials sciences division at Lawrence Berkeley National Laboratory (LBNL) in 2010. She was promoted to Senior Staff Scientist in 2018. She has been an adjunct professor in department of materials science and engineering at the University of California, Berkeley since 2013. Her research considers the nucleation, nanoscale materials transformations, and dynamic phenomena at solid-liquid interfaces, especially those involve non-equilibrium processes, which she studies by developing and advancing the state-of-art in situ liquid phase electron microscopy, cryogenic electron microscopy and other techniques. Her research effort has led to over 140 publications, which can be found on the google scholar here

Awards 
 2003 Materials Research Society Graduate Student Gold Medal Award
 2011 United States Department of Energy Office of Science Early Career Award
 2013 LBNL Director’s Award for Exceptional Scientific Achievement
 2019 MRS Medal Award
 2021 Elected a Fellow of the Materials Research Society

Selected publications

References

External links 

Living people
Year of birth missing (living people)